is a Japanese women's professional shogi player ranked 4-dan.

Early life and education
Nishiyama was born on June 27, 1995 in Ōsakasayama, Osaka. She first was exposed to shogi as a three-year-old by watching her father and older sister play but really learned how to play the game as a five-year-old first-grade elementary school student. She soon started attending a neighborhood shogi school three times a week and playing practice games on the Internet.  In 2009, she won the girls' division of the 30th  as a junior high school second-grade student and thereafter was accepted into the Japan Shogi Association's training group in Osaka. Nishiyama quickly progress through the training group system and was eventually was accepted into the 's  apprentice school at the rank of  6-kyū under the tutelage of shogi professional Hirofumi Itō.

After high school, Nishiyama moved to Tokyo to study environmental informatics at Keio University, but she has been on a leave of absence to focus on shogi since 2015.

Apprentice shogi professional
Nishiyama was promoted to the rank of apprentice professional 1-dan in January 2014, becoming just the second woman to achieve that rank after Kana Satomi. Later that same year in September 2014, she became the second woman to be promoted to the rank of apprentice professional 2-dan (once again after Satomi). Nishiyama was 19 years and 2 months old when she was promoted, thus breaking Satomi's record of 21 years and 4 months. In December 2015, Nishiyama was promoted to the rank of apprentice professional 3-dan, thus becoming the second woman (yet again following Satomi) to achieve such a rank. At age 20 years and 5 months, she also broke Satomi's record of 21 years and 9 months. With Satomi having to leave the 3-dan league in 2018, Nishiyama is now the only woman competing in the league .

Nishiyama finished the 66th 3-dan League (October 2019March 2020) in third place with a record of 14 wins and 4 losses. Going into the last day of league play, Nishiyama was in provisional third place with a record of 12 wins and 4 losses, trailing Hiroki Taniai (13 wins and 3 losses) and Shinichirō Hattori (12 wins and 4 losses). Since Nishiyama's league seed was the lowest of the three, she needed to win both of her games and finish at least one game ahead of one of the other two to obtain automatic promotion to the rank of professional 4-dan. Taniai lost one of his two games, but Hatori and Nishiyama won both of theirs which meant that all three finished league play with the same record. Although Nishiyama missed out on being promoted due to her lower seed, her result was good enough to earn her a promotion point for future league play and means she needs only one more promotion point to qualify for full-professional status.

On April 1, 2021, the  announced that it had accepted Nishiyama's request to leave the apprenticeship school and become a women's professional under its affiliation. Nishiyama posted a message to her fans and supported on her personal Twitter earlier that same day which thanked them for their support and explained that she decided to make the switch after giving the matter long consideration. The end of her career as an apprentice professional means she now only be able to become a regular shogi professional via the Professional Admissions Test available to qualifying amateurs and women professionals. On the other hand, it also means that she could now complete in all tournaments and title matches open to women's professional, and not only those in which apprentice professionals were allowed to participate.

Promotion history
Nishiyama's promotion history as an apprentice professional is as follows.
 6-kyū: 2010
 1-dan: January 2014
 2-dan: September 2014  
 3-dan: December 2015
 Leaves apprentice professional school to become women's professional: March 31, 2021

Note: Ranks are apprentice professional ranks.

Women's shogi professional
Nishiyama's first appearance came in a women's maor title match came in 2014 when she challenged fellow apprentice shogi professional Momoko Katō for the 4th  title, but she lost the match 3 games to none.

Nishiyama and Katō met again in May 2018 in the 11th  and its Jo-Ō title. Nishiyama defeated the defending Jo-Ō Katō 3 games to 1 to win her first major title match. Nishiyama's victory also made her the second apprentice professional after Katō to win a women's professional shogi major title. Nishiyama successfully defended her Jo-Ō title the following year when she defeated women's professional shogi player Kana Satomi 3 games to 1 in May 2019.

Nishiyama challenged Satomi for 41st  title in OctoberNovember 2019. She won the first game of the match, lost the second, but won the deciding third game to capture the title 2 games to 1.

In OctoberDecember 2019, Nishiyama and Satomi met in the 9th Women's Ōza title match, their third major title match in six months. Nishiyama won the match 3 games to 1 to capture another of Satomi's titles and also become a 3-crown title holder for the first time.

In June 2020, Nishiyama successfully defended her Jo-Ō title by defeating Momoko Katō 3 games to 2 to win the 13th Women's Myavi Open Tournament. That same year in October, she defended her Women's Ōshō title by defeating Yuki Muroya 3 games to 2 in the 42nd  Women's Ōshō title match. Two months later in December, she successfully defended her Woman’s Ōza by defeating  3 games to 2.

In her first major title defense since leaving the 's apprentice school and officially changing her status to women's professional, Nishiyama defeated :Sae Itō 3 games to 2 to win the 14th Women's Myavi Open Tournament and retain her Jo-Ō title in June 2021.

Nishiyama defeated Mana Watanabe 4 games to none to win the 1st  title in SeptemberOctober 2021. The victory made Nishiyama a Women's 4-crown title holder and the first prize of JPY 15,000,000, the biggest winner's prize in women's professional shogi. In OctoberNovember 2021, Nishiyama defended her Women's Ōshō title against , but lost the 43rd Ōshō title match 2 games to 1 to drop back to 3-crown status. Nishiyama was also unsuccessful in her Ōza title defense against Satomi in the 11th Ōza title match (October 2021December 2021) in 2021; this time Nishiyama lost the match 3 games to none.

In AprilJune 2022, Nishiyama challenged  for the 33rd Women's Ōi title but was defeated 3 games to 1. Nishiyama and Satomi also faced each other in the 15th Mynavi Women's Open title match (AprilJune 2022) with Nishiyama winning the best-of-five series 3 games to 2. By defending her Jo-Ō title and winning the tournament for the fifth consecutive time, Nishiyama became the first women's professional to qualify for the "Lifetime Jo-Ō" title. Nishiyama's victory also secured her promotion to the rank of women's professional 4-dan.

In AugustOctober 2022, Nishiyama faced Satomi once again in 2nd Hakurei title match. This time, however, Satomi came out on top and won the match 4 games to 3 to capture Nishiyama's Hakurei title.　Nishiyama, however, returned to 2-crown status a week later when she defeated Satomi in Game 3 of the 34th Women's Ōshō title match (October 2022) on October 28, 2022, to win the match 2 games to 1 and recapture the Women's Ōshō title. The two players faced each other yet again in a major title match a few days later with Nishiyama challenging Satomi for her  title. This was Nishiyama's first appearance in the Kurashiki Tōka Cup title match, but her title challenge was unsuccessful and she lost the 30th Kurashiki Tōka Cup title match (November 2022) 2 games to none.

Nishiyama won the Women's Meijin title for the first time in February 2023 when she defeated reigning Women's Meijin  3 games to 1 to win the 49th Women's Meijin title match. It was the first time Nishyama had challenged for the Women's Meijin title.

Titles and other championships
Nishiyama has appeared in women's professional shogi major title matches a total of eighteen times and has won twelve titles.

Major titles

Promotion history
Nishiyama's promotion history as a women's professional is as follows.
 3-dan: April 1, 2021
 4-dan: June 13, 2022 

Note: Ranks are women's professional ranks.

Awards and honors
Nishiyama won the Japan Shogi Association’s Annual Shogi Award for "Women's Professional Game of the Year" for the 2019 shogi year (April 2019March 2020) and the 2020 shogi year (April 2020March 2021). She won the "Excellent Women's Professional" award for the 2021 shogi year (April 2021March 2022).

Personal life
Nishiyama's older sister  is an Go professional.

References

External links
 

1995 births
Living people
Japanese shogi players
Women's professional shogi players
Professional shogi players from Osaka Prefecture
People from Ōsakasayama, Osaka
Keio University alumni
Queen (shogi)
Women's Ōshō
Women’s Ōza
Hakurei title holders
Women's Meijin